Herbert Taylor Pearson (5 August 1910, in Palmerston North – 15 June 2006, in Auckland) was a New Zealand cricketer who played for Auckland in the 1930s and 1940s. He played in 30 first-class matches, scoring 1392 runs at an average of 30.26 with a best score of 172.

See also
 List of Auckland representative cricketers

External links
 Cricinfo Profile
 CricketArchive Profile

1910 births
2006 deaths
Auckland cricketers
New Zealand cricketers
Cricketers from Palmerston North
New Zealand Services cricketers
North Island cricketers